Mother of the Gods may refer to:

Rhea (mythology) in Greek mythology
Cybele in Roman mythology